In certain theories of linguistics, thematic relations, also known as semantic roles, are the various roles that a noun phrase may play with respect to the action or state described by a governing verb, commonly the sentence's main verb. For example, in the sentence "Susan ate an apple", Susan is the doer of the eating, so she is an agent; an apple is the item that is eaten, so it is a patient.

Since their introduction in the mid 1960s by Jeffrey Gruber and Charles Fillmore, semantic roles have been a core linguistic concept and ground of debate between linguist approaches, because of their potential in explaining the relationship between syntax and semantics (also known as the syntax-semantics interface), that is how meaning affects the surface syntactic codification of language. The notion of semantic roles play a central role especially in functionalist and language-comparative (typological) theories of language and grammar.

While most modern linguistic theories make reference to such relations in one form or another, the general term, as well as the terms for specific relations, varies: "participant role", "semantic role", and "deep case" have also been employed with similar sense.

History
The notion of semantic roles was introduced into theoretical linguistics in the 1960s, by Jeffrey Gruber and Charles Fillmore, and also Jackendoff did some early work on it in 1972.

The focus of these studies on semantic aspects, and how they affect syntax, was part of a shift away from Chomsky's syntactic-centered approach, and in particular the notion of the autonomy of syntax, and his recent Aspects of the Theory of Syntax (1965).

Major thematic relations 
The following major thematic relations have been identified:

Agent 

 deliberately performs the action (e.g. Bill ate his soup quietly). The actions can be both conscious or unconscious. In syntax, the agent is the argument of a transitive verb that corresponds to the subject in English.

Experiencer 

 the entity that receives sensory or emotional input (e.g. Susan heard the song. I cried).

Stimulus 

 entity that prompts sensory or emotional feeling – not deliberately (e.g. David loves onions!).

Theme 

 undergoes the action but does not change its state (e.g. We believe in one God. I have two children. I put the book on the table. He gave the gun to the police officer.) (Sometimes used interchangeably with patient.) In syntax, the theme is the direct object of a ditransitive verb.

Patient 

 undergoes the action and changes its state (e.g. The falling rocks crushed the car.). (Sometimes used interchangeably with theme.) In syntax, the patient is the single object of a (mono)transitive verb.

Instrument 

 used to carry out the action (e.g. Jamie cut the ribbon with a pair of scissors.).

Force or natural cause 

 mindlessly performs the action (e.g. An avalanche destroyed the ancient temple.).

Location 

 where the action occurs (e.g. Johnny and Linda played carelessly in the park. I'll be at Julie's house studying for my test.).

Direction or goal 

 where the action is directed towards (e.g. The caravan continued on toward the distant oasis. He walked to school.).

Recipient 

 a special kind of goal associated with verbs expressing a change in ownership, possession (e.g. I sent John the letter. He gave the book to her). In syntax, the recipient or goal is the indirect object of a ditransitive verb.

Source or origin 

 where the action originated (e.g. The rocket was launched from Central Command. She walked away from him.).

Time 

 the time at which the action occurs (e.g. The pitcher struck out nine batters today)

Beneficiary or recipient

 the entity for whose benefit the action occurs (e.g. I baked Reggie a cake. He built a car for me. I fight for the king.).

Manner 

 the way in which an action is carried out (e.g. With great urgency, Tabitha phoned 911.).

Purpose 

 the reason for which an action is performed (e.g. Tabitha phoned 911 right away in order to get some help.).

Cause 

 what caused the action to occur in the first place; not for what, rather because of what (e.g. Because Clyde was hungry, he ate the cake.).

There are not always clear boundaries between these relations. For example, in "the hammer broke the window", hammer might be labeled an agent (see below), an instrument, a force, or possibly a cause. Nevertheless, some thematic relation labels are more logically plausible than others.

Grouping into the two macroroles of actor and undergoer 
In many functionally oriented linguistic approaches, the above thematic roles have been grouped into the two macroroles (also called generalized semantic roles or proto-roles) of actor and undergoer. This notion of semantic macroroles was introduced by Van Valin's Ph.D. thesis in 1977, developed in role and reference grammar, and then adapted in several linguistic approaches.

According to Van Valin, while thematic roles define semantic relations, and relations like subject and direct object are syntactic ones, the semantic macroroles of actor and undergoer are relations that lie at the interface between semantics and syntax.

Linguistic approaches that have adopted, in various forms, this notion of semantic macroroles include: the Generalized Semantic Roles of Foley and Van Valin Role and reference grammar (1984), David Dowty’s 1991 theory of thematic proto-roles, Kibrik's Semantic hyperroles (1997), Simon Dik's 1989 Functional discourse grammar, and some late 1990s versions of Head-driven phrase structure grammar. 

In Dowty’s theory of thematic proto-roles, semantic roles are considered as prototype notions, in which there is a prototypical agent role that has those traits characteristically associated to it, while other thematic roles have less of those traits and are accordingly proportionally more distant to the prototypical agent. The same goes for the opposite pole of the continuum, the patient proto-role.

Relationship to case 
In many languages, such as Finnish, Hungarian and Turkish, thematic relations may be reflected in the case-marking on the noun. For instance, Hungarian has an instrumental case ending (-val/-vel), which explicitly marks the instrument of a sentence. Languages like English often mark such thematic relations with prepositions.

Conflicting terminologies 
The term thematic relation is frequently confused with theta role. Many linguists (particularly generative grammarians) use the terms interchangeably. This is because theta roles are typically named by the most prominent thematic relation that they are associated with. To make matters more confusing, depending upon which theoretical approach one assumes, the grammatical relations of subject and object, etc., are often closely tied to the semantic relations. In the typological tradition, for example, agents/actors (or "agent-like" arguments) frequently overlap with the notion of subject (S). These ideas, when they are used distinctly, can be distinguished as follows:
 Thematic relations
 are purely semantic descriptions of the way in which the entities described by the noun phrase are functioning with respect to the meaning of the action described by the verb. A noun may bear more than one thematic relation. Almost every noun phrase bears at least one thematic relation (the exception are expletives). Thematic relations on a noun are identical in sentences that are paraphrases of one another.
 Theta roles
 are syntactic structures reflecting positions in the argument structure of the verb they are associated with. A noun may only bear one theta role. Only arguments bear theta roles. Adjuncts do not bear theta roles.
 Grammatical relations
 express the surface position (in languages like English) or case (in languages like Latin) that a noun phrase bears in the sentence.

Thematic relations concern the nature of the relationship between the meaning of the verb and the meaning of the noun. Theta roles are about the number of arguments that a verb requires (which is a purely syntactic notion). Theta roles are syntactic relations that refers to the semantic thematic relations.

For example, take the sentence "Reggie gave the kibble to Fergus on Friday."
 Thematic relations: Reggie is doing the action so is the agent, but he is also the source of the kibble (note Reggie bears two thematic relations); the kibble is the entity acted upon so it is the patient; Fergus is the direction/goal or recipient of the giving. Friday represents the time of the action.
 theta roles: The verb give requires three arguments (see valency). In generative grammar, this is encoded in terms of the number and type of theta roles the verb takes. The theta role is named by the most prominent thematic relation associated with it. So the three required arguments bear the theta roles named the agent (Reggie) the patient (or theme) (the kibble), and goal/recipient (Fergus). On Friday does not receive a theta role from the verb, because it is an adjunct. Note that Reggie bears two thematic relations (Agent and Source), but only one theta role (the argument slot associated with these thematic relations).
 grammatical relations: The subject (S) of this sentence is Reggie, the object (O) is the kibble, the indirect object is to Fergus, and on Friday is an oblique.

See also 
 Morphosyntactic alignment
 Case grammar
 Theta roles
 Semantic role labeling, a natural language processing task to automatically determine thematic roles
 Lexical function

Inline references

Further references 

 Carnie, Andrew. 2007. Syntax: A Generative introduction. 2nd Edition. Blackwell Publishers.
 Davis, Anthony R.: Thematic roles. In: Claudia Maienborn, Klaus von Heusinger, Paul Portner (Hrsg.): Semantics: an international handbook of natural language meaning. Vol. 1. Berlin 2011, S. 399–420.handbook of natural language meaning. Vol. 1. Berlin 2011, S. 399–420.
 
 Fillmore, Charles. 1968. The Case for Case. In Universals in Linguistic Theory, eds. Emmon Bach and R.T. Harms. New York: Holt, Rinehart and Winston.
 Fillmore, Charles. 1971. Types of lexical information. In Semantics. An interdisciplinary reader in philosophy, linguistics and psychology, eds. D. Steinberg and L. Jacobovitz: Cambridge University Press.
  (Chapter V. Thematic Roles, pp. 197–249)
 Angela D. Friederici, Anja Hahne, Axel Mecklinger: Temporal structure of syntactic parsing. Early and late event-related potential effects. In: Journal of Experimental Psychology: Learning, Memory and Cognition. 22-5, (1996), S. 1219–1248.
 Gruber, Jeffrey. 1965. Studies in lexical relations, MIT: Ph.D. 
 Gruber, Jeffrey Thematic relations in syntax. In: Mark R. Baltin, Chris Collins (Hrsg.): The handbook of contemporary syntactic theory. Blackwell, Oxford 2000, ISBN 0-631-20507-1, S. 257–298.
 Harley, Heidi. In press. Thematic Roles. In Patrick Hogan, ed. The Cambridge Encyclopedia of Linguistics. Cambridge University Press.
 Higginbotham, James (1999) Thematic Roles, pp. 837-8, in: The MIT Encyclopedia of the Cognitive Sciences, Edited by Keil & Wilson (1999) Cambridge, MA: The MIT Press.
 Jackendoff, Ray. 1983. Semantics and cognition. Cambridge, Massachusetts: MIT Press.
 Jackendoff, Ray. 1990. Semantic structures. Cambridge, Massachusetts: MIT Press.
 McRae, Ken and Ferretti, Todd R. and Amyote, Liane: Thematic roles as verb-specific concepts. In: Language and cognitive processes. 12-2/3, (1997) 137–176.
 Primus, Beatrice: Semantische Rollen. Winter, Heidelberg 2012, ISBN 978-3-8253-5977-5
 Primus, Beatrice: Participant roles. In: Nick Riemer (Hrsg.): The Routledge Handbook of Semantics. London 2016, S. 403–418.
 Van Valin, Robert (2008) Introduction to Syntax. Cambridge University Press, Cambridge 2008, ISBN 0-521-63566-7
 Van Valin Jr, R. D. (1977). Aspects of Lakhota Syntax. University of California, Berkeley.

Thematic roles
Semantics